The Claim is a 2000 Western romance film directed by Michael Winterbottom and starring Peter Mullan, Wes Bentley, Sarah Polley, Nastassja Kinski and Milla Jovovich. The screenplay by Frank Cottrell Boyce is loosely based on the 1886 novel The Mayor of Casterbridge by Thomas Hardy. The original music score is composed by Michael Nyman. The film did poorly at the box office and was received as an average film by critics.

Plot
Daniel Dillon is an Irish immigrant who settles in the high mountains of California during the Gold Rush of 1849. It is now 1867, and Dillon has a vault filled with gold and a town of his own, named Kingdom Come. Dillon owns nearly every business of consequence in the town; if someone digs for gold, rents a hotel room, opens a bank account, or commits a crime, they will have to deal with Dillon.

Donald Dalglish is a surveyor with the Central Pacific Railroad, which wants to put a train either through Kingdom Come, or somewhere in the vicinity. He is here to decide the route. Dillon is anxious to ensure that the railway line is routed through "his" town, as this will bring more business.

Among the travelers who arrive in town with Dalglish are two women, the beautiful but ailing Elena Burn and her lovely teenage daughter Hope. The presence of these women is deeply troubling for Dillon, for they are the keys to a dark secret Dillon has kept from the people of Kingdom Come for nearly twenty years. Dillon had come to these mountains with his Polish wife Elena and their months-old baby, Hope. On a cold and snowy night they happen upon a shack named Kingdom Come, owned by a disillusioned '49er named Burn. Like Hardy's Mayor of Casterbridge, Dillon sells Elena and Hope to the prospector in exchange for the small gold claim that would later flourish and make Dillon so wealthy. Burn has died, and Elena has come to find Dillon because Burn left her with nothing, she is dying, and she wants Dillon to give her $200 per year so that she can "do right by Hope".

Dillon tells Lucia that they have to end their relationship and gives her some gold bricks and the deeds to her home, the saloon/brothel, and the tobacco house. Lucia is heartbroken, wanting Dillon and not his money. Dillon tells Elena that he never married anyone else because he was always married to her. The two renew their marriage but their time together is short, filled with Dillon's efforts to find a cure for her illness and ending with her death.

Elena's death coincides with the decision to route the railway some distance from the town for easier passage and construction. Lucia moves the girls, the booze and the tobacco house to the valley, effectively moving the entire population of Kingdom Come to her new town of Lisboa, named for her father's home in Portugal, to be near the railroad. Following Elena's funeral, Hope tells Dillon that she is leaving to find Dalglish and start a life with him. Dillon takes her up to the original shack Kingdom Come, showing her a picture of their family when she was a baby, and revealing the deal made right on that spot between him and Burn. Hope leaves him and goes to the new Lisboa.

Dillon is thus faced with the loss of both Elena and Hope, and his town. He sets fire to all the buildings in Kingdom Come. The smoke attracts the people of Lisboa, who find Dillon's frozen body in the snow near his original shack. Lucia is devastated, crying over the frozen body as it is brought back to the ruins of Kingdom Come. While many of the 'former' townspeople rush to find Dillon's stockpile of gold in the burned out vault, Hope and Dalglish choose instead to follow Dillon's body as Lucia and others continue with it down the mountain.

Cast

 Peter Mullan as Daniel Dillon
 Milla Jovovich as Lucia
 Wes Bentley as Donald Dalglish
 Nastassja Kinski as Elena Dillon/Burn
 Sarah Polley as Hope Dillon/Burn
 Julian Richings as Frank Bellanger
 Shirley Henderson as Annie
 Sean McGinley as Sweetley
 Tom McCamus as Burn
 Karolina Muller as Young Elena
 Barry Ward as Young Dillon
 Duncan Frasier as Crocker

Production

Filming
Primary filming took place at the Fortress Mountain Resort in Kananaskis Country, Alberta, Canada. Near the end of the film, in a scene where the character of Dillon is standing in the street and throws an oil can onto a burning building, you can see the tower, cables and chairs of a modern ski lift in the background. The decision to have the film's dramatic burning of the entire town of Kingdom Come also served as a first step to fulfill the producer's commitment to return the site to its original natural condition.

Some secondary filming took place in Colorado. The town that Lucia creates in the valley below Kingdom Come is not to be confused with the real town of Lisbon, California (now the unincorporated community of Arcade), located on the route of the Sacramento Northern Railway which started operation in 1918.

Soundtrack

The Claim is Michael Nyman's first (and, as of 2008, only) score for a Western, and his second collaboration with Michael Winterbottom. In it, in particular, in "The Shootout," Nyman pays homage to Ennio Morricone's Western scores. "The Shootout" also incorporates material from A Zed & Two Noughts and Prospero's Books in a layered manner with elements of the main themes of the score and a Morricone-style trumpet motif. The score includes the principal scalar riff that appears in numerous Nyman works, including Out of the Ruins, String Quartet No. 3, À la folie, Carrington, the rejected score from Practical Magic, and The End of the Affair. The Claim marks Michael Nyman's last use of this musical material (as of 2008).

Portions of the score appear as solo piano works on Nyman's 2005 album, The Piano Sings, which features Nyman's personal piano interpretations of music he had written for various films.

Track listing
The Exchange
The First Encounter
The Hut
The Explosion
The Recollection
The Fiery House
The Betrothal
The Firework Display
The Train
The Shootout
The Death Of Elena
The Explanation
The Burning
The Snowy Death
The Closing

Production details
Artists: The Michael Nyman Orchestra
Composed and conducted by Michael Nyman
Orchestration: Gary Carpenter/Michael Nyman
Programmer and music editor: Robert Worby
Auricle Operator: Chris Cozens
Engineer: Austin Ince
Assistant Engineers: Simon Changer and Ryu Kawashima
Recorded, mixed and edited at Whitfield Sterret Studios, London, September 2000
Music published by Northlight Music Ltd. (BMI)
Design/Illustration: Dave McKean at Hourglass

Reception
The film has a 62% approval rating at Rotten Tomatoes. Robert Roten writing for Laramie Movie Reviews found the film to be watchable though very slow in narrative pace stating, "It reminded me of the scene in Aguirre, The Wrath of God where the boat is dragged through the jungle. If the story was as crisp as the snow, and the plot advanced faster than a glacier, this might have been a better film. I'm glad I didn't spend more than a dollar on this. It rates a C."

Roger Ebert gave The Claim a strong review, praising the film for its direction and cinematography.

References

External links
 
 
 

2000 films
British romantic drama films
Canadian romantic drama films
English-language Canadian films
2000s English-language films
Films based on The Mayor of Casterbridge
Films based on romance novels
Films directed by Michael Winterbottom
2000 romantic drama films
2000 Western (genre) films
United Artists films
Films with screenplays by Frank Cottrell-Boyce
2000s Canadian films
2000s British films